The 2022 Gran Canaria Challenger was a professional tennis tournament played on clay courts. It was the third edition of the tournament which was part of the 2022 ATP Challenger Tour. It took place in Las Palmas, Spain between 28 February and 6 March 2022.

Singles main-draw entrants

Seeds

1 Rankings as of 21 February 2022.

Other entrants
The following players received wildcards into the singles main draw:
  Roberto Carballés Baena
  Pablo Llamas Ruiz
  Pol Martín Tiffon

The following players received entry from the qualifying draw:
  Miguel Damas
  Carlos López Montagud
  Johan Nikles
  Matthieu Perchicot
  Oriol Roca Batalla
  Pol Toledo Bagué

Champions

Singles

 Gianluca Mager def.  Roberto Carballés Baena 7–6(8–6), 6–2.

Doubles

 Sadio Doumbia /  Fabien Reboul def.  Matteo Arnaldi /  Luciano Darderi 5–7, 6–4, [10–7].

References

2022 ATP Challenger Tour
2022 in Spanish tennis
February 2022 sports events in Spain
March 2022 sports events in Spain